"Dead Man Walking" is a song by English musician David Bowie, released as the third single from his 21st album, Earthling (1997). Written by Bowie and Reeves Gabrels, it was a number 32 hit in the UK.

Background
The guitar riff used in the intro dates back to the mid-1960s when Jimmy Page taught it to Bowie. "Jimmy said, 'I've got this riff and I can't do anything with it. Do you want it?'" Guitarist Reeves Gabrels related: "It does sound fairly Page-y, like a mutated Johnny Burnette Trio thing." Bowie used the riff for "The Supermen" in 1970, and revived it 25 years later for "Dead Man Walking".

Critical reception
British magazine Music Week rated "Dead Man Walking" five out of five, declaring it as "without doubt the best track" on the Earthling album. The reviewer noted that it "demonstrates that Bowie retains a keener ear for contemporary music and a hunger greater than many artists half his age."

Live versions
Bowie played an acoustic version of the song on Late Night with Conan O'Brien with Reeves Gabrels. This was later released on the show's Live from 6A compilation album. When Bowie died in January 2016, Conan O'Brien broadcast the performance at the end of his show in remembrance. Another live version recorded at Fort Apache Studios, 8 April 1997, was broadcast at WBCN. The year after this version appeared on the album WBCN Naked Too. Bowie played a different live acoustic version of "Dead Man Walking" at a concert at Smith's Olde Bar in Atlanta, Georgia on 4 August 1997, which was hosted by Atlanta alternative rock radio station 99X. 99X later included it as a track on their 99X Live X IV "Home" CD. A July 1997 performance at the Phoenix Festival was released in 2021 on Look at the Moon! (Live Phoenix Festival 97).

Versions and remixes

Singles

 2-track CD
 "Dead Man Walking (edit)" – 4:01
 "Dead Man Walking (Album version)" – 6:50

Released 21 March 1997 in the Netherlands by BMG.

 Arista / 74321 47480 2 (EU)
 "Dead Man Walking (Moby mix)" – 7:31
 "Dead Man Walking (Album version)" – 6:50
 "I'm Deranged (Jungle mix)" – 7:00

Released 21 March 1997 in the Netherlands by BMG.

 CD: Arista / 74321 47614 2 (EU)
 "Dead Man Walking (Moby mix)" – 7:31
 "Dead Man Walking (House mix)" – 6:00
 "Dead Man Walking (This One's Not Dead Yet Remix)" – 6:28
 "Dead Man Walking (Vigor Mortis Remix)" – 6:29

Released 24 March 1997 in the Netherlands by BMG.

 CD: RCA / 74321 47584 2 (UK)
 "Dead Man Walking (Single edit)" – 4:01
 "I'm Deranged (Jungle mix)" – 7:00
 "The Hearts Filthy Lesson (Good Karma mix)" – 5:00

Released 14 April 1997 in UK by RCA and BMG.

 CD: RCA / 74321 47585 2 (UK)
 "Dead Man Walking (Album version)" – 6:50
 "Dead Man Walking (Moby mix 1)" – 7:31
 "Dead Man Walking (House mix)" – 6:00
 "Dead Man Walking (This One's Not Dead Yet Remix)" – 6:28

Released 14 April 1997 in UK by RCA and BMG.

 CD: Arista / 74321 47614 2 (Australia)
 "Dead Man Walking (Single edit)" – 4:01
 "Dead Man Walking (Moby mix 1)" – 7:31
 "Dead Man Walking (House mix)" – 6:00
 "Dead Man Walking (This One's Not Dead Yet Remix)" – 6:28
 "Dead Man Walking (Vigor Mortis Remix)" – 6:29

Released 28 April 1997 in Australia by BMG.

 Arista / BVCA-8845 (Japan)
 "Dead Man Walking (Single edit)" – 4:01
 "Dead Man Walking (House mix)" – 6:00
 "Dead Man Walking (This One's Not Dead Yet Remix)" – 6:28
 "I'm Deranged (Jungle mix)" – 7:00

Released May 1997 in Japan.

 UK 12" vinyl version
 "Dead Man Walking (House mix)" – 6:00
 "Dead Man Walking (Vigor Mortis Remix)" – 6:29
 "Telling Lies (Paradox mix)"

 Italian 12" vinyl version
 "Dead Man Walking (Moby mix 1)" – 7:31
 "Dead Man Walking (House mix)" – 6:00
 "Dead Man Walking (This One's Not Dead Yet Remix)" – 6:28
 "Dead Man Walking (Vigor Mortis Remix)" – 6:29

At least six additional promo singles were released.

Group members
David Bowie – production, writing credits, vocals, sampling

Session musicians
 Gail Ann Dorsey – bass guitar, backing vocals
 Zachary Alford – drums
 Mike Garson – keyboards, piano
 Mark Plati – drum loops, electronic percussion, production, programming, samples
 Reeves Gabrels – production, writing credits, programming, guitar, vocals

Charts

Other releases
 It was featured in the 1997 film The Saint.
 Two Moby mixes were released on the bonus disc of the 2004 Digibook Expanded Edition of Earthling.

Use in other media
 "Dead Man Walking" was used as introduction for Lo Que Queda del Día, a late-afternoon news programme from Chilean Radio Cooperativa. It was also included in the soundtrack to The Saint.
 Used as theme music for early episodes of MTV's Making the Video.

References

David Bowie songs
1997 singles
Music videos directed by Floria Sigismondi
Songs written by David Bowie
Songs written by Reeves Gabrels
Song recordings produced by David Bowie
1997 songs